SS Jaguar or SS Jaguar could refer to:

SS Jaguar, early Jaguar cars were known as SS Jaguars, SS Cars Ltd built them 
, a Panamanian steamship